Black Mountain is a village situated between Armidale and Guyra, located on the Northern Tablelands in the New England region of New South Wales, Australia.

Features and location
The New England Highway is the main transport link to Armidale. The Northern Railway tracks still pass through the village, but this section of the line, north of Armidale, is now disused.

Black Mountain village exists in two sections. Located on the New England Highway is the Black Mountain Roadhouse and motel at the top of notorious Devil’s Pinch, which is subject to snow falls that close the road.

The Black Mountain area was a well known haunt of Captain Thunderbolt.

Sheep and beef cattle breeding is the main industry of the area.

Black Mountain Baptist Church was built there in 1902 and restored in 1992. Black Mountain has a public school and nursery which is the home of the award-winning three point linkage Youman Tree Planter machine and services. Booroolong Railway Station Post Office opened on 8 December 1884, was renamed Black Mountain around 1886 and closed in 1985.

Heritage listings
Black Mountain has a number of heritage-listed sites, including:
 Main Northern railway: Black Mountain railway station

See also

 Little Nymboida River
 Nymboida River

References

Guyra Guide 2008, The Guyra Argus, Guyra 2008

External links
Your information guide to Black Mountain

Towns in New South Wales
Towns in New England (New South Wales)